An England "A" team, led by Alan Wells, toured India and Bangladesh during January and February 1995.

The India part

The Bangladesh part

References

Sources
 Wisden Cricketers' Almanack 1996, pp. 1004–13
 Indian Cricket 1995

External links
England 'A' in India and Bangladesh : Jan/Feb 1995 at Cricinfo
England A in India and Bangladesh 1994/95 at CricketArchive

1995 in Bangladeshi cricket
1995 in English cricket
1995 in Indian cricket
English cricket tours of Bangladesh
English cricket tours of India
International cricket competitions from 1994–95 to 1997
Bangladeshi cricket seasons from 1971–72 to 2000
Indian cricket seasons from 1970–71 to 1999–2000